San Sai is a tambon (subdistrict) of Phrao District, in Chiang Mai Province, Thailand. In 2005 it had a population of 6,646 people. The tambon contains 15 villages.

References

Tambon of Chiang Mai province
Populated places in Chiang Mai province